David Rokeby (born in 1960 in Tillsonburg, Ontario) is an artist who has been making works of electronic, video and installation art since 1982. He lives with his wife, acclaimed pianist Eve Egoyan, and daughter, Viva Egoyan-Rokeby, in Toronto, Canada.

His early work Very Nervous System (1982–1991) is acknowledged as a pioneering work of interactive art, translating physical gestures into real-time interactive sound environments. Very Nervous System was presented at the Venice Biennale in 1986.

Work
Rokeby's pioneering interactive work Very Nervous System has been evolving since 1982. In Wired Magazine the work is described as 
"A combination of technologies, some off-the-shelf, some rare and esoteric, and some cooked up by Rokeby himself. Initially, in 1982, much more of the system was homemade. His circuitry, designed to speed up the response of the sluggish Apple II, was still not fast enough to analyze an image from an ordinary video camera, so he built his own low-res device: a little box with 64 light sensors behind a plastic Fresnel lens. But Very Nervous System has been evolving for 13 years, during which time the world has seen any number of technological revolutions. So Rokeby now has a lot more store-bought components incorporated into the system: it can handle a Mac Quadra and real video cameras, via sophisticated "Max" software from Paris."

A number of Rokeby's works address issues of digital surveillance, including Watch (1995), Guardian Angel (2002) and Sorting Daemon (2003). In addition to his surveillance art, other works engage in a critical examination of the differences between human and artificial intelligence. The Giver of Names (1991) and n-cha(n)t (2001) are artificial subjective entities, provoked by objects or spoken words in their immediate environment to formulate sentences and speak them aloud.

He has exhibited and lectured extensively in the Americas, Europe and Asia. He is the Director of the BMO Lab for Creative Research in the Arts, Performance, Emerging Technologies and AI at the Centre for Drama, Theatre and Performance Studies at the University of Toronto. http://www.bmolab.ca

Major Exhibitions 
Chengdu Biennale:SUPERFUSION, Chengdu, China (2021)

Human Intelligence, Centre Culturel Canadien, Paris, France (2020)

Realidad Elástica, Laboral Centro de Arte y Creación Industrial, Gijòn, Spain (2013)

Panorama 14, Le Fresnoy Studio Nationale des arts contemporains, Tourcoing, France (2012)

See This Sound, Lentos Museum, Linz, Austria (2009)

Synthetic Time, National Art Museum of China, Beijing, China (2008)

e-art, Musée des Beaux Arts de Montréal, Montréal, Canada (2007)

Profiling, Whitney Museum of American Art, New York City, U.S.A. (2007)

David Rokeby, Silicon Remembers Carbon (retrospective), FACT, Liverpool, and CCA, Glasgow, U.K. (2007)

Algorithmische Revolution, Zentrum für Künst und Media, Karlesruhe, Germany (2004)

Einbildung, Das Wahrnehmen in der Kunst, Kunsthaus Graz, Graz Austria (2003) 

Governor General's Award Winners, National Gallery of Canada, Ottawa Canada (2002)

Venice Biennale of Architecture, Venice, Italy (2002) 

Ars Electronica, Linz, Austria (2002, 1998 and 1991)

Alien Intelligence, Kiasma Museum of Contemporary Art, Helsinki, Finland (2000)

Kwangju Biennale, Kwangju, Korea (1995)

Feuer / Erde / Wasser/ Luft, Mediale, Deichtorhallen, Hamburg, Germany (1993)

Venice Biennale, Venice, Italy (1986)

Awards 
For his installation n-cha(n)t, Rokeby was awarded the Prix Ars Electronica (Golden Nica for Interactive Art) in 2002. In 2002 he was awarded a Governor General's Award in Visual and Media Arts. Very Nervous System was awarded the first Petro-Canada Award for Media Arts in 1988 and Austria's Prix Ars Electronica Award of Distinction for Interactive Art in 1991. Watched and Measured (2000) was awarded the first BAFTA award for interactive art from the British Academy of Film and Television Arts in 2000.

References

Further reading

 Cooper, Douglas. "Very Nervous System: Artist David Rokeby adds new meaning to the term interactive."  Wired Issue 3.03 (Mar 1995) 
 Gale, Peggy, Sara Diamond and Su Ditta. David Rokeby. Oakville, Ont.: Oakville Galleries, 2005. 
 Leopoldseder, Hannes and Christine Schöpf. Prixars Electronica : 2002 cyberarts : international compendium prix ars electronica : net vision/net excellence, interactive art, computer animation/visual effects, digital musics, cybergeneration : u90-freestyle computing. Ostfildern, Germany: Hatje Cantz, 2002.

External links
 David Rokeby - home page
 Horizon Zero 3 - Invent issue with information about Rokeby's works
 AudioHyperspace - Interview with David Rokeby

1960 births
Living people
Canadian installation artists
Canadian video artists
New media artists
Artists from Ontario
People from Tillsonburg
Governor General's Award in Visual and Media Arts winners